Byodo-In may refer to:

 Byōdō-in, a Buddhist temple in the city of Uji in Kyoto Prefecture, Japan
 Byodo-In (Hawaii), a Buddhist temple on the island of Oʻahu in the State of Hawaiʻi, United States